The Bohemian Forest, known in Czech as Šumava and in German as Böhmerwald, is a low mountain range in Central Europe. Geographically, the mountains extend from Plzeň Region and South Bohemia in the Czech Republic to Austria and Bavaria in Germany, and form the highest truncated uplands of the Bohemian Massif, up to 50 km wide. They create a natural border between the Czech Republic on one side and Germany and Austria on the other.

Names and etymology
For political reasons, the Bohemian and German sides have different names in their languages: in Czech, the Bohemian side is called Šumava and the Bavarian side Zadní Bavorský les, while in German, the Bohemian side is called Böhmerwald, and the Bavarian side Bayerischer Wald.

In Czech, Šumava is also used as a name for the entire region in Bohemia and Germany.

The designation Šumava has been attested in the late 15th century in Antonio Bonfini's work Rerum unganicarum decades. Folk etymology connects the name's origin with the Czech words šum, šumění (literally hum, humming) denoting the noise of trees in the wind. The most accepted opinion among linguists derives Šumava from a theorized Proto-Slavic word '*šuma = "dense forest", cf. Serbian šuma as it adjoins regions populated by Sorbs of Lusatia and surrounds (North Eastern Bavaria and Saxony). There are corresponding toponyms in modern day Serbia (Balkans) i.e. Šumadija (land of dense forests).
Modern Serbian maintains the use of the word 'Šuma' (Forest) and the toponym Šumava equates to Forested lands. 

In the ancient maps of astronomer and geographer Ptolemaios, the mountain chain is called Gabreta. In the maps of Greek geographer Strabo the mountain chain is called Sudeta. Both names given to the mountain chain are of Celtic etymology.

Geography and climate
The Bohemian Forest comprises heavily forested mountains with average heights of 800–1,400 metres. The highest peak is Großer Arber (1,456 m) on the Bavarian side; the highest peak on the Bohemian and Austrian side is the Plöckenstein (Plechý, 1,378 m). The most eastern peak is the Sternstein (1,125 m). The range is one of the oldest in Europe, and its mountains are eroded into round forms with few rocky parts. Typical for the Bohemian Forest are plateaux at about 1,000–1,200 m with relatively harsh climates and many peat bogs.

Water

The Bohemian Forest is the dividing range between the watersheds of the Black Sea and the North Sea, where water collected by the Vltava, Otava and Úhlava rivers flows. These rivers all spring from the Bohemian Forest. Owing to heavy precipitation (mostly snow), the peat bogs and the Lipno Dam, the Šumava region is an important water reservoir for Central Europe. More important for their aesthetic value than for holding water are several lakes of glacial origin.

Nature
As a border region, the Bohemian Forest has had a complicated history. In the 20th century it was part of the Iron Curtain, and large areas were stripped of human settlement. Even before that, settlement was sparse and for centuries forests dominated over human dwellings and pathways. These unique circumstances led to the preservation of unspoilt nature and forest ecosystems relatively unaffected by human activity. On the other hand, many habitats dependent on farming activity are slowly turning into forest.

In the Czech Republic, the most valuable area is protected in the Šumava National Park and Protected Landscape and the UNESCO Biosphere Reserve. Part of the German section is protected as the Bavarian Forest National Park. The Bohemian Forest is a popular holiday destination because it is excellent hiking country. Most interesting natural and cultural sights are connected with more than 500 km of summer marked trails and many bike trails. However, park administration is not always successful in its task, and many believe the rapid growth of tourist accommodation and services is destroying the former calm of the Šumava region. Šumava National Park is also suffering from problems connected with bark beetles, and there is heated debate about how to deal with them.

History
According to archaeological findings, the Bohemian Forest area was not significantly populated during the Paleolithic era – the Stone Age (dates back to 9000 BC). The initial settlements of a more permanent character appeared in the southwest of Bohemia during the Bronze Age (3,000 to 1,000 years BC). In the 1st century AD, the forest was inhabited by Gallo-Romans as well as by Germanic tribes in its northern part.

The Celts were however gradually forced out by the Germanic tribe (the Marcomanni), who left the Celtic agricultural settlements desolated. With the departure of the Marcomanni, the forests were left to evolve with almost no human influence. The Bohemian Forest forests began to change character only with the arrival of the Slavs in the 6th century, who found a refuge in the middle of the impenetrable forests. The cultural landscape began to penetrate the wooded surroundings. The gradual but disorganized and fairly subtle form of colonisation continued until the late 11th century. Slavic settlement gradually shifted south, without however reaching the upper Vltava valley. Slavic-founded settlements carried the names of Christian Saints, which indicates that the founding was after the Christianization of Bohemia.  Some toponyms indicate that the new Slavic settlers came in contact with remaining Germanic people. 
 
Under the rule of Ottokar I of Bohemia, organized colonization of Bohemian Forest by German settlers began. Bavarian settlers after various wars  with Serbs (modern Serbs/Sorbs) for domination over the region, cleared the forest and founded settlements in the to date largely uninhabited mountainous region, which thereby became culturally close to Bavaria. Since then the nature in Bohemian Forest, including the forested landscape developed under the strong influence of human activity. The borderline virgin forests receded, making way for fields and pastures, and thus in the 13th century, the colonisation of the Bohemian borderland began.

In the area, 136 villages with German names relating to forest clearing (Rdoungsnamen) existed. In addition, groups of German village names appear, one such group between Sonnberg (first mentioned in 1279) and Deutsch Reichenau (1261), another group around Zettwing (1356). South of Ottau, German villages form a line along the road from Linz through Hohenfurth to Krummau. Another old settlement area was between Untermoldau (1376, today: Dolní Vltavice) and Obermoldau (1359). 

In 1945–1946, the region's Bohemian Germans were expelled. The originally Sorbian population moved to adjoining places which to this day testify to their origins in places throughout North Bohemia i.e Srbská Kamenice.

Notable people
 Karel Klostermann, author
 Adalbert Stifter, author

See also
Towns in the Bohemian Forest
Grafenau (DE) 
Kašperské Hory (CZ) 
Prachatice (CZ) 
Regen (DE) 
Vimperk (CZ)
Volary (CZ) 
Vyšší Brod (CZ) 
Železná Ruda (CZ) 
Zwiesel (DE)

Regions
Bavarian Forest (DE)
South Bohemia (CZ)
Mühlviertel (AT)
Plzeň Region (CZ)
Waldviertel (AT)

References

External links

National Park administration
Šumava
Info Šumava
webcam Šumava

 
Forest
Mountain ranges of the Czech Republic
Mountain ranges of Bavaria
Mountain ranges of Austria